Dharti Ka Veer Yodha Prithviraj Chauhan is an Indian historical drama broadcast on Star Plus. It was produced by Sagars which is based on Prithviraj Raso, a Brajbhasha poem by Chand Bardai which portrays the life of Prithviraj Chauhan, a 12th-century Rajput emperor in India. Rajat Tokas played the younger Prithviraj Chauhan and Anas Rashid played adult Prithviraj Chauhan.

The series is considered one of the costliest ones produced at that time.

Synopsis 

The drama is based on Prithviraj Chauhan, a ruler of the Chauhan dynasty. Proficient in military skills, he took the throne of Ajmer at age 13 after his father died in battle. His maternal grandfather, Anangpal Tomar, ruler of Delhi, declared Prithviraj Chauhan his heir after discovering his courage and bravery. This antagonizes King Jaichand (Jaichand of Kannauj) who was expecting to be declared the heir. Chauhan falls in love with Sanyogita (Samyukta), the daughter of his enemy, Jaichand and elopes with her at her swayamvara ceremony.

Background 

The serial is based on the tales of the three most powerful ruling Rajput families of that time: those of Ajmer, Kannauj and Delhi. Roopsundari and Kamlavati are daughters of the King of Delhi, Anangpal I. Kamlavati is married to Someshwar Chauhan of Ajmer and Roopsundari to Vijaypal of Kannauj. Someshwar and Kamlavati are worried about not having an heir. They offer prayers and seek blessings from the God for a child. Someshwar thanks Vijaypal and Roopsundari for supporting them. Kamlavati suggests Someshwar marry another woman so that the dynasty will have an heir, but he dismisses that suggestion. Finally, Someshwar is happy to know that Kamlavati will soon conceive, and proclaims it. After some time, Kamlavati and Someshwar pray to God and are blessed with a son they name Prithviraj Chauhan III. Prithvi is sent to Gurukul to study and gain martial skill. A brilliant student, Prithvi attends the Vansaj of Eklavya who can hit targets with a bow and arrow by merely hearing them which is also known as Shabd Bhedi Baan Vidya.

Cast 
 Rajat Tokas / Anas Rashid as Prithviraj Chauhan/Surya
 Mugdha Chaphekar/ Pooja Joshi Arora / Sheetal Dabholkar as Sanyogita/Nandini
 Jas Arora as Someshvara Chauhan
 Sunila Karambelkar as Prithvi's mother Maharani Kamlavati
 Rupali Ahuja as Sayaali
 Vinod Kapoor as Someshwar's Mantri Dushyant
 Mehul Vyas as Sanjham
 Harsh Somaiya as Chandar
 Harsh Rajput/Altaf Hussain as Pundir
 Kush Kumar Sharma / Sidharth Malhotra / Kumar Hegde as Jaichand
 Imran Khan as Alha
 Raja Gulati/Javed Khan/Shobbit Atre as Chandra Bardai
 Gaurav Kumar – Arjun
 Jay Soni / Preet Saluja as Samar Singh
 Chinky Jaiswal / Swini Khara / Sareeka Dhillon as Pritha, Prithviraj's sister
Ram Awana as Mahipath
Vishnu Sharma as Jaimal 
 Vimmy Bhatt as Jwala
 Shaji Chaudhary as Bhimdev's minister
 Rizwana Seikh / Richa Mukharji as Vaishali
 Irfan Haossain as Mohammad Of Gor
 Chetan Hansraj as King of Gujrat Bhimdev 
 Lavina Tandon as Chamki
 Raji Patel as Gitanjali
 Amit Panchori as Shikandar
 Raj Premi- Shera/ Kanha Chauhan
 Anurag Sharma as Elder Vanraj
 Nirav Soni as Kanha
Varun Anand Mousam as King Kartikey
 Sudeep Sarangi as Arjun

Production
The series was filmed at sets created in Sagar Sun City in Baroda with ₹4 and half crore spent for erecting the sets of palace which also consisted of a desert and a lake and with a budget of ₹20 crores .

In November 2008, the shootings and telecast of all the Hindi television series including this series and films were stalled on 8 November 2008 due to dispute by the technician workers of FWICE (Federation of Western India Cine Employees) for increasing the wages, better work conditions and more breaks between shootings. FWICE first took a strike on 1 October 2008 when they addressed their problems with the producers and production was stalled. A contract was signed after four days discussions and shooting were happening only for two hours content in a day then after which differences increased between them while channels gave them time until 30 October 2008 to sort it out. Failing to do so lead to protests again from 10 November 2008 to 19 November 2008 during which channels blacked out new broadcasts and repeat telecasts were shown from 10 November 2008. On 19 November 2008, the strike was called off after settling the disputes and the production resumed. The new episodes started to telecast from 1 December 2008.

Reception
During June 2006, it garnered its peak rating of 5.67 TVR.

In September 2006, the Vice President of India then, Bhairon Singh Shekhawat appreciated the channel and producers for the series.

Rajat Tokas received the best actor award in Indian Television Awards during 2007 for his lead role of Prithviraj Chauhan.

Music 
Sagar Pictures released an original soundtrack for the television series with lyrics and music by composer Ravindra Jain. The title song was written by Sohan Sharma and composed by Gaurav Issar. The songs were sung by Ajoy Chakrabarty, Udit Narayan, Roop Kumar Rathod, Babul Supriyo, Suresh Wadkar, Sushil Kumar, Shreya Ghoshal and Sadhna Sargam.

 "Dharti Ka Veer Yodha Prithviraj Chauhan" (title song), sung by Shahid Malliya
 "O Vidhaata", sung by Roop Kumar Rathod, Sadhna Sargam
 "Raj Dulare so ja", sung by Sadhna Sargam
 "Uttaradhikaari", sung by Pandit Ajoy Chakrabarty
 "Sun re Megha", sung by Udit Narayan, Shreya Ghoshal
 "Jai Bholenath", sung by Babul Supriyo, Sushil Kumar
 "Mitti", sung by Suresh Wadkar
 "Har Nazar Ko Dua," (Singer unknown)
 "Haayo Rabba," (Singer unknown)
 "Prem Kaahaniyan," (Singer unknown)
 "Kanha Re Thoda Sa Pyaar De," sung by Kavita Krishnamurthy and Suresh Wadkar
 "Mitwaa – male and female versions (Singers unknown)
 "Naa Aankhon Mein Aansu" (Singer unknown)
 "Jai Gauri Jai Namah Shivaay" (Singer unknown)
 "Mere Naam Ki Mehendi" (Singers unknown)
 "Ek Tha Rajkumar (Mere Saathiyaa)" — (Singers unknown)

References

External links 
Dharti Ka Veer Yodha Prithviraj Chauhan on IMDb
Dharti Ka Veer Yodha Prithviraj Chauhan streaming on Hotstar

Indian television soap operas
StarPlus original programming
Indian period television series
Indian historical television series
2006 Indian television series debuts
2009 Indian television series endings
Television shows set in Rajasthan
Television series set in the 12th century